Camp Tawonga is a 160-acre residential Jewish summer camp located on the middle fork of the Tuolumne River, a few miles west of Yosemite National Park, in the Stanislaus National Forest. The camp operates as a non-profit organization and is affiliated with the Jewish Community Center Association. The camp is located in Groveland, California, although the nearest town is actually a tiny area called Buck Meadows. Tawonga has its main office in San Francisco. Many attendees come from the San Francisco Bay Area, but attendees from Israel, Los Angeles, and other states are often present as well.

History
Camp Tawonga was established by Louis and Emma Blumenthal in 1925 and was originally established in 1928 as separate camps known as Camp Kelowa for Boys, and Singing Trail for Girls at Huntington Lake just below the alpine level at 7,000 feet, located in the High Sierras, 65 miles Northeast of Fresno, and closed for several years during the Second World War. Camp Tawonga moved to its current site on the middle fork of the Tuolumne River in 1963. During 2003-2007, Camp Tawonga ran the Oseh Shalom-Sanea al Salam—the Palestinian-Jewish Family Peacemakers Camp—in cooperation with the Jewish-Palestinian Living Room Dialogue.  On July 3, 2013, a tree fell at the camp, killing an Arts and Crafts specialist and injuring several others as campers were evacuated to the girls' side field. In August 2013, the camp was in the path of the Rim Fire. After the camp was evacuated, a staff member returned to the camp to rescue a Torah scroll which had previously survived the Holocaust. The camp lost three buildings to the fire; other damage was described as repairable and is now rebuilt. On July 31, 2018, just two days into the last summer session of the year, all of Camp Tawonga evacuated due to dangerous air quality caused by the local Ferguson Fire and the firefighters' "back burning" techniques. In the summer of 2019, Camp Tawonga became one of the first summer camps in the United States to offer all-gender cabins. In 2020, the camp procured a replacement Torah scroll from the former B'Nai Israel synagogue in Olean, New York. On July 11, 2021, a counselor named Eli Kane died from drowning off-site while working at the camp. https://www.mercurynews.com/2021/07/17/berkeley-high-grad-champion-soccer-player-dies-in-river-near-yosemite/

Facility
Camp Tawonga's facility supports roughly 500 attendees and staff, with about 2,000 attendees and staff participating each year. There are around 30 rustic-style cabins without electricity, running water, or heating, used for campers in the summer. There are around 20 heated or powered cabins that are used for other guests. There is a lodge-style dining hall equipped with a Kosher kitchen and back porch overlooking a lake. An Arts-and-Crafts shed, Olympic sized swimming pool, team building ropes course, and outdoor amphitheater are just some of Tawonga's many on-site buildings.

Among its programs are an LGBTQ family weekend (Camp Keshet), the only such program in the country.

Cultural references
Steve Almond has written about his experiences at the camp in his works, including (Not That You Asked) Rants, Exploits and Obsessions.

See also
List of summer camps

A Visit to Camp Kelowa and Singing Trail - 
Original film was produced by Louis and Emma Blumenthal to provide a glimpse of life at both Camp Kelowa and Camp Singing Trail in 1936. fully difgitized and found at Internet Archive
https://archive.org/details/cbm_00002
https://archive.org/details/cbm_000010

References

External links
Camp Tawonga's official website
Campsite history (video at camp website)

Tawonga
Buildings and structures in El Dorado County, California
Buildings and structures in Tuolumne County, California
Youth organizations based in California
Tourist attractions in El Dorado County, California
Tourist attractions in Tuolumne County, California
Non-profit organizations based in California
LGBT events in California
1925 establishments in California
Non-profit organizations based in San Francisco
1963 establishments in California